The 2015 Oklahoma Sooners baseball team will represent the University of Oklahoma during the 2015 NCAA Division I baseball season. The Sooners will play their home games at L. Dale Mitchell Baseball Park as a member of the Big 12 Conference. They will be led by head coach Pete Hughes, in his second season at Oklahoma.

Previous season
In 2014, the Sooners finished the season 8th in the Big 12 with a record of 29–29, 8–16 in conference play. They qualified for the 2014 Big 12 Conference baseball tournament, and were eliminated in the second round. They failed to qualify for the 2014 NCAA Division I baseball tournament.

Personnel

Roster

Coaching staff

Schedule

Awards and honors
Sheldon Neuse
Perfect Game USA Pre-season Second Team All-American
 Baseball America Pre-season First team All-American

References

Oklahoma Sooners
Oklahoma Sooners baseball seasons